Ira Jan (Russian: И́ра Ян) is the pseudonym of the painter and writer Esther Yoselevitch Slepyan (Эсфи́рь Иосиле́вич Слепя́н; 2 February 1869 – 24 April 1919), although primarily known as Haim Nahman Bialik's mistress, she was also a member of the commune at Bezalel and among the founders of Gymnasia Rehavia.

Biography 
Esther Yoselevitch was the youngest of three children of an Enlighted Jewish family in Kishinev, then in the Russian Empire and now part of Moldova. Her father, Joseph (Osip) Yoselevitch, was an influential Russian lawyer. Recognizing her artistic talent, her father sent her at the age of 16 to study at the Moscow School of Painting, Sculpture and Architecture in Moscow, an uncommon move in Jewish society at that time. After completing her studies in Moscow, she studied in Paris, where her brother, Shimon, was practicing medicine. After returning to Kishinev, she became involved with members of the Socialist Revolutionary Party, one of whom was the bacteriology student Dmitry Slepian (Дмитрия Слепяна), who she married and with whom she had a daughter, Elena (Елены).

In 1903, after the Kishinev pogrom, Hayim Nahman Bialik, later recognized as Israel's national poet, was sent to Kishinev by the Jewish Historical Commission in Odessa to interview survivors and prepare a report. There Jan met and fell in love with Bialik and subsequently left her husband and the revolutionary circles. She wrote later, "These three weeks gave me the happiness of being with our great poet. He brought me back to my people and to himself."

In 1906 Jan immigrated to Ottoman Palestine with her daughter. In 1908 she settled in Jerusalem and became associated with the loose group of artists who called themselves "The New Jerusalem", founded by Boris Schatz whom she had met in Paris. She lived in a commune-like setting in a building near the Bezalel Academy, that Schatz had placed in the disposal of the artists group, together with Rachel Yanait Ben-Zvi, Yitzhak Ben-Zvi and others from the group. During this period, she translated into Russian Bialik's prose poem Scroll of Fire and the poem The Dead of the Desert. Rachel Yanait and Jan became very close, and would walk around Jerusalem, with Jan drawing and painting scenes and people of the city. Jan also published some essays and poems in Eliezer Ben-Yehuda's newspaper HaZvi (later renamed "HaOr"). For lack of an appropriate school framework for their children, the artist group also founded the Gymnasia Rehavia.

In 1914, following the outbreak of World War I, Jan, together with the gymnasia staff and many of the artists group, moved to Tel Aviv and lived in the Adler House. There she continued to teach drawing at the Herzliya Hebrew Gymnasium, where Nachum Gutman was one of her students. In the 1917 Tel Aviv and Jaffa deportation Jan was deported to Alexandria in Egypt, where she lived in poverty for four months, and contracted tuberculosis. Just before the deportation, she managed to hastily hide all her large oil paintings in the Tel Aviv attic of Avraham Brill, a Jewish Colonization Association official, and upon returning to Tel Aviv she discovered that all had disappeared. She died of the tuberculosis and of a broken heart due to the loss of her works.

Relationship with Bialik 
From the 1980s, academic studies uncovered the tangled web of Bialik and Ira Jan's love. With the pogrom in the background, Jan fell in love with the poet, left her husband and prior beliefs, and immigrated to The Land of Israel.

Bialik was married, but heartbroken by the fact that they were childless, and was obviously attracted to the artist. Some scholars, including Ziva Shamir and Hillel Barzel, believe that at least two of Bialik's poems, "Thou Art Leaving Me" (״הולכת את מעמי״) and "To Your Secret Path" (״לנתיבך הנעלם״), were dedicated to Jan.

Bialik apparently concealed his love to her for fear of losing his reputation, cut all contact with her after she left for the Land of Israel, and only went to the Land of Israel himself after she had died. Only in 1972 did some scholars reveal some letters that expressed Bialik's big secret, that were hidden by Moshe Ungerfeld, the second administrator of the Bialik House. Ungerfeld's incentive, too, was protecting Bialik's reputation. Additional related material was found after Ungerfeld's death in 1983.

Ziva Shamir believes that a large portion of Bialik's works were directly inspired by his relationship with Jan, that, in her opinion, were the central love affair of his life.

Further reading 
The publications listed below are in Hebrew.
 Rachel Yanait Ben Zvi, Ira Jan; Tel Aviv: Neuman publishers, 1965 (art album)
 Nurit Govrin, "A Woman Alone: The Painter Ira Jan as an Israeli Storyteller", in "Honey from the Rock: Studies of Eretz Israel Literature",  The Ministry of Defence Press, 1989, pp. 354–407.
 Ziva Shamir, "To Your Secret Path: The Trail of the Ira Jan Affair in Bialik's Works" (edited by Haim Cohen), Tel Aviv, Hakibbutz Hameuchad, 2000
 Eda Zoritte, "Life's Love: the Tragic Love of Painter Ira Jan to Haim Nahman Bialik", Jerusalem, Keter, 2000 (a novel)
 Ruth Baki Kolodny, "Take Me Under Your Wing: A Journey in the Tracks of Ira Jan" (Letters translated from Russian by  Peter Kriksonov,  Viktor Radutsky and Aharon Ormian), Tel Aviv, Hakibbutz Hameuchad, 2003 (a biography)
 Shlomo Shva, "O thou seer, go: Haim Nahman Bialik's Life Story", Dvir, 1990 (a biography)

References 

1869 births
1919 deaths
19th-century women artists
Artists from Chișinău
People from Kishinyovsky Uyezd
Moldovan artists
Moldovan Jews
Moldovan women
Bessarabian Jews
Emigrants from the Russian Empire to the Ottoman Empire
Ashkenazi Jews in Ottoman Palestine
Jewish women writers
Jewish women painters
Jewish painters
Pseudonymous artists
Burials at Trumpeldor Cemetery
20th-century deaths from tuberculosis
Tuberculosis deaths in the Ottoman Empire
Moscow School of Painting, Sculpture and Architecture alumni